Tin-Essako is a rural commune and village, in the Tin-Essako Cercle in Mali's north-eastern Kidal Region. The village lies 115 km due east of Kidal. In the 2009 census the commune had a total population of 2,595.

References

External links
.

Communes of Kidal Region
Tuareg